Andreas Schockenhoff (23 February 1957 – 13 December 2014) was a German politician for the CDU. From 1990 until his death in 2014, he served as a member of the German Bundestag. In the general election in 2013, he was elected the seventh consecutive year as a direct mandate for the federal electoral district Ravensburg in the German Bundestag.

From 2006 until early 2014, Schockenhoff served as coordinator for the Cabinet of Germany, and was responsible for German-Russian cooperation. As distinctive foreign policymaker he was known for his criticism of Putin's government, and supported a more active German role in international crises.

Schockenhoff was born in Ludwigsburg, Germany. He died in Ravensburg, Germany, aged 57.

He admitted in 2011 that he was an alcoholic.

References

1957 births
2014 deaths
Members of the Bundestag for Baden-Württemberg
People from Ludwigsburg
21st-century German civil servants
Recipients of the Cross of the Order of Merit of the Federal Republic of Germany
Members of the Bundestag 2013–2017
Members of the Bundestag 2009–2013
Members of the Bundestag 2005–2009
Members of the Bundestag 2002–2005
Members of the Bundestag 1998–2002
Members of the Bundestag 1994–1998
Members of the Bundestag 1990–1994
Members of the Bundestag for the Christian Democratic Union of Germany